Caesar Busdragus or Cesare Busdrago (died October 1585) was a Roman Catholic prelate who served as Archbishop of Chieti (1578–1585) and Bishop of Alessano (1574–1578).

Biography
On 1 October 1574, Caesar Busdragus was appointed during the papacy of Pope Gregory XIII as Bishop of Alessano. On 11 August 1578, he was appointed during the papacy of Pope Gregory XIII as Archbishop of Chieti. He served as Archbishop of Chieti until his death in October 1585.

References

External links and additional sources
 (for Chronology of Bishops) 
 (for Chronology of Bishops) 
 (for Chronology of Bishops) 
 (for Chronology of Bishops) 

16th-century Roman Catholic archbishops in the Kingdom of Naples
Bishops appointed by Pope Gregory XIII
1585 deaths